Alex Miskirtchian (born 24 December 1985) is an Armenian-Belgian professional boxer. He is the former EBU Featherweight Champion.

Professional career 
Miskirtchian won the EBU Featherweight title by defeating then EBU Featherweight Champion Sofiane Takoucht via decision on September 30, 2011.

Professional boxing record

|-
|align="center" colspan=8|28 Wins (11 knockouts), 5 Losses, 1 Draw 
|-
| align="center" style="border-style: none none solid solid; background: #e3e3e3"|Result
| align="center" style="border-style: none none solid solid; background: #e3e3e3"|Record
| align="center" style="border-style: none none solid solid; background: #e3e3e3"|Opponent
| align="center" style="border-style: none none solid solid; background: #e3e3e3"|Type
| align="center" style="border-style: none none solid solid; background: #e3e3e3"|Round
| align="center" style="border-style: none none solid solid; background: #e3e3e3"|Date
| align="center" style="border-style: none none solid solid; background: #e3e3e3"|Location
| align="center" style="border-style: none none solid solid; background: #e3e3e3"|Notes
|-align=center
|Win
|28-5-1
|align=left| Bilindo Eseko
|UD
|6 
|17/6/2017
|align=left| Kinshasa, Congo
|align=left|
|-align=center
|Win
|27-5-1
|align=left| Kamarudeen Boyefio
|KO
|3 
|28/10/2016
|align=left| Kinshasa, Congo
|align=left|
|-align=center
|Loss
|26-5-1
|align=left| Viorel Simion
|UD
|12
|18/03/2016
|align=left| Bucharest, Romania
|align=left|
|-align=center
|Win
|26-4-1
|align=left| Roman Rafael
|TKO
|2 
|13/02/2016
|align=left| Sportova hala MSO, Štúrovo, Slovakia
|align=left|
|-align=center
|Loss
|25-4-1
|align=left| Cornelius Lock
|TKO
|3 
|25/08/2015
|align=left| MCU Park, Brooklyn, New York, United States
|align=left|
|-align=center
|Win
|25-3-1
|align=left| Michael Escobar
|UD
|8
|14/03/2015
|align=left| Spiroudome Arena, Charleroi, Hainaut, Belgium
|align=left|
|-align=center
|Loss
|24-3-1
|align=left| Evgeny Gradovich
|UD
|12
|31/05/2014
|align=left| Cotai Arena, Venetian Resort, Macau, China
|align=left|
|-align=center
|Win
|24-2-1
|align=left| Sofiane Takoucht
|MD
|12
|11/01/2014
|align=left| Country Hall, Sart Tilman, Liege, Belgium
|align=left|
|-align=center
|Win
|23-2-1
|align=left| Andras Varga
|KO
|2 
|11/05/2013
|align=left| Hall Octave Henry, Saint Servais, Namur, Belgium
|align=left|
|-align=center
|Win
|22-2-1
|align=left| Andreas Evensen
|TKO
|12 
|09/02/2013
|align=left| Blue Water Dokken, Saint Servais, Esbjerg, Denmark
|align=left|
|-align=center
|Win
|21-2-1
|align=left| Philippe Frenois
|UD
|12
|28/04/2012
|align=left| Spiroudome Arena, Charleroi, Hainaut, Belgium
|align=left|
|-align=center
|Win
|20-2-1
|align=left| Sofiane Takoucht
|SD
|12
|30/09/2011
|align=left| Spiroudome Arena, Charleville-Mézières, Ardennes, France
|align=left|
|-align=center
|Win
|19-2-1
|align=left| Ignac Kassai
|TKO
|4 
|19/03/2011
|align=left| Salle des sports d'Anseremme, Anseremme, Namur, Belgium
|align=left|
|-align=center
|Win
|18-2-1
|align=left| Rachamongkol Sor Pleonchit
|TKO
|4 
|27/03/2010
|align=left| Basket Club de Ciney, Ciney, Namur, Belgium
|align=left|
|-align=center
|Win
|17-2-1
|align=left| Osman Aktas
|UD
|12
|24/10/2009
|align=left| Collège Notre-Dame de Bellevue, Dinant, Namur, Belgium
|align=left|
|-align=center
|Win
|16-2-1
|align=left| Samir Boukrara
|KO
|3 
|01/05/2009
|align=left| Hall Octave Henry, Namur, Namur, Belgium
|align=left|
|-align=center
|Win
|15-2-1
|align=left| Ruddy Encarnacion
|SD
|10
|11/04/2009
|align=left| Salle de la Plante, Namur, Namur, Belgium
|align=left|
|-align=center
|Win
|14-2-1
|align=left| Martin Holub
|KO
|1 
|22/02/2009
|align=left| Éghezée, Namur, Belgium
|align=left|
|-align=center
|Loss
|13-2-1
|align=left| Paul Truscott
|PTS
|8
|03/10/2008
|align=left| Meadowside Leisure Centre, Burton-on-Trent, Staffordshire, United Kingdom
|align=left|
|-align=center
|Win
|13-1-1
|align=left| Lorenzo Ledesma
|UD
|4
|24/05/2008
|align=left| Hall Octave Henry, Namur, Namur, Belgium
|align=left|
|-align=center
|Win
|12-1-1
|align=left| Elemir Rafael
|TKO
|5 
|26/04/2008
|align=left| Montignies sur Sambre, Hainaut, Belgium
|align=left|
|-align=center
|Loss
|11-1-1
|align=left| Antonio De Vitis
|UD
|12
|28/02/2008
|align=left| PalaFerrua, Savigliano, Piemonte, Italy
|align=left|
|-align=center
|Win
|11-0-1
|align=left| Lorenzo Ledesma
|UD
|6
|12/01/2008
|align=left| Lotto Arena, Antwerpen, Antwerpen, Belgium
|align=left|
|-align=center
|Win
|10-0-1
|align=left| Pascal Bouchez
|UD
|6
|17/11/2007
|align=left| Complexe Sportif, Andenne, Luxembourg, Luxembourg, Belgium
|align=left|
|-align=center
|Win
|9-0-1
|align=left| Pascal Bouchez
|TKO
|5 
|09/06/2007
|align=left| Antwerpen, Antwerpen, Belgium
|align=left|
|-align=center
|Win
|8-0-1
|align=left| Tomas Berki
|TKO
|1 
|15/04/2007
|align=left| Montignies sur Sambre, Hainaut, Belgium
|align=left|
|-align=center
|Win
|7-0-1
|align=left| Guillaume Tajan
|PTS
|6
|10/02/2007
|align=left| Casino Barriere, Dinant, Namur, Belgium
|align=left|
|-align=center
|Win
|6-0-1
|align=left| Cristian Niculae
|PTS
|6
|09/12/2006
|align=left| Cuesmes, Hainaut, Belgium
|align=left|
|-align=center
|Win
|5-0-1
|align=left| Faycal Messaoudene
|UD
|4
|18/11/2006
|align=left| Casino, Namur, Namur, Belgium
|align=left|
|-align=center
|style="background:#abcdef;"|Draw
|4-0-1
|align=left| Mohamed Bouleghcha
|PTS
|4
|29/04/2006
|align=left| Chatelineau, Hainaut, Belgium
|align=left|
|-align=center
|Win
|4–0
|align=left| Thomas Blondel
|PTS
|4
|15/04/2006
|align=left| Centre Culturel, Éghezée, Namur, Belgium
|align=left|
|-align=center
|Win
|3–0
|align=left| Miloud Saadi
|PTS
|6
|28/01/2006
|align=left| Salle Belle Vue, Dinant, Namur, Belgium
|align=left|
|-align=center
|Win
|2–0
|align=left| Lorenzo Ledesma
|PTS
|4
|16/04/2005
|align=left| Namur, Namur, Belgium
|align=left|
|-align=center
|Win
|1–0
|align=left| Nikolai Volovoy
|PTS
|4
|22/01/2005
|align=left| Salle Belle Vue, Dinant, Namur, Belgium
|align=left|
|-align=center

References

External links 

 
 

1985 births
Living people
Armenian male boxers
Featherweight boxers